Bayenghem is part of the name of 2 communes in the Pas-de-Calais department of France:

 Bayenghem-lès-Éperlecques
 Bayenghem-lès-Seninghem